Mixx FM 107.7 is a commercial radio station broadcasting from Swan Hill, Victoria, Australia. It is currently owned by Ace Radio & broadcasts A Contemporary Hits Radio (CHR) format. It features both locally produced content & nationally syndicated content from both NOVA Entertainment & Grant Broadcasters. They have a repeater in Kerang on 98.7FM.

References

Radio stations in Victoria
Ace Radio
Swan Hill